Corral Quemado may refer to the following places:

Corral Quemado, Catamarca, village in Catamarca Province, Argentina
Corral Quemado, Córdoba, village in Córdoba Province, Argentina
Puerta de Corral Quemado, village in Catamarca Province, Argentina
Corral Quemado, Chile, locality in Santiago Province, Chile